Pacto de amor (English title: Covenant of love) is a Mexican telenovela produced by Ernesto Alonso for Televisa in 1977.

Cast 

Claudia Islas as Delia 
Jorge Rivero as Damian 
Lupita D'Alessio as Julia 
Pilar Pellicer as Blanca 
Héctor Bonilla as Guillermo 
Sergio Jiménez as Alonso 
Miguel Macía as Rodolfo 
Susana Cabrera as Leonidas 
María Teresa Rivas as Ruth 
Carlos Amador as Margarito
Carlos Argüelles as Federico
Arturo Benavides as Sergio
Odiseo Bichir as Guillermo
Rocío Brambila as Mireya
Ada Carrasco as Ernestina
Manolo García as Miguel
Jaime Garza 
Jaime González as Javier 
Simón Guevara as Alonso
Aarón Hernán 
Ana Bertha Lepe as Margot
Amalia Llergo as Alicia 
Ernesto Marin 
Mary Carmen Martínez as Julia 
Oscar Morelli 
Frank Moro as Federico
Ignacio Rubiel as Ricardo
Héctor Sáez as Padre Juan
Patricia Tanus as Blanca 
Alejandro Ángeles as Damián

References

External links

Mexican telenovelas
1977 telenovelas
Televisa telenovelas
Spanish-language telenovelas
1977 Mexican television series debuts
1977 Mexican television series endings